The swimming competition at the 1995 South Asian Federation Games  in Madras, India.

Result

Men's events

References

Swimming at the South Asian Games
1995 South Asian Games
1995 in swimming